Amblysterna is a genus of beetles in the family Buprestidae, containing the following species:

 Amblysterna johnstoni Waterhouse, 1885
 Amblysterna natalensis (Fahraeus, 1851)

References

Buprestidae genera